Ukraine power grid hack may refer to:
 2015 Ukraine power grid hack
 2016 Kyiv cyberattack